FLAC may refer to:
 Free Lossless Audio Codec, an audio data compression scheme.
 Free Legal Advice Centres, an Irish organization
 Florida Automatic Computer, an early digital electronic computer
 Striplin FLAC, an ultralight aircraft, where the abbreviation stands for Foot Launched Air Cycle

See also
 FLAK (disambiguation)